Oxycarenus is a genus of ground bugs belonging to the family Lygaeidae, subfamily Oxycareninae. There are approximately fifty-five described species of Oxycarenus, and a number are documented as important crop pests.

Species
Selected species:

 Oxycarenus bicolor
 Oxycarenus hyalinipennis (A. Costa, 1843), cotton pest
 Oxycarenus laetus Kirby
 Oxycarenus lavaterae (Fabricius, 1787)
 Oxycarenus longiceps Wagner, 1955
 Oxycarenus lugubris
 Oxycarenus modestus (Fallén, 1829)
 Oxycarenus pallens (Herrich-Schäffer, 1850)

References

External links
 BioLib
 Fauna Europaea

Lygaeidae